The South Carolina Supreme Court is the highest court in the U.S. state of South Carolina.  The court is composed of a Chief Justice and four Associate Justices.

Judicial selection
South Carolina is one of two states where the state legislature elects state court judges, including the justices on the state supreme court. A ten-person committee (composed mostly of state legislators) called the Judicial Merit Selection Commission (JMSC) winnows down the number of candidates to fill a judicial vacancy to three based on candidate qualifications. The General Assembly must then choose from one of these three candidates to fill a judicial vacancy. However, candidates who gauge a lack of support amongst the General Assembly often drop out of the race, leaving the Assembly only one candidate to vote for.

The JMSC is composed of five members appointed by the House Speaker of the South Carolina House of Representatives, three members appointed by the Senate Judiciary Committee chairman, and two members appointed by the South Carolina Senate president. South Carolina statutory law requires that six of the ten JMSC members be state legislators. 

Justices on the supreme court serve ten-year terms and there is no prohibition against justices serving multiple terms on the court. However, there is a mandatory retirement age of 72 for state trial judges and state appellate judges.

The judicial selection process has been criticized by commentators for its opacity. Following the supreme court's opinion striking down the state's fetal heartbeat bill in 2022 based on its violation of the state constitution's right to privacy, state legislators began to deliberate on reforms to the judicial selection process and Governor Henry McMaster called for reform in his 2023 State of the State address.

Current justices of the court

Jurisdiction
The court enjoys both original and appellate jurisdiction.  It enjoys exclusive appellate jurisdiction for all state cases regarding the death penalty, state utility rates, judgments involving public bonded indebtedness and elections, and orders limiting state grand juries and relating to abortions by minors.  Original jurisdiction pertains to the issuance writs including mandamus, certiorari, and very extraordinary bills.

Additional charges of the court
The South Carolina Supreme Court oversees the admission of individuals to practice law in the state.  Much of the administration regarding admissions and practice is delegated to the South Carolina Bar, established by statute as an administrative arm of the court; however, the court retains ultimate authority in South Carolina governing the practice of law. It also supervises the disciplining of attorneys and suspension of those no longer able to practice due to mental or physical condition.

History

The Supreme Court of South Carolina Building is located in the state capital of Columbia. The court moved into its current location, a former United States Post Office building, in 1971. It was built between 1917 and 1921, and is a two-story, Neo-Classical style building. The building has been listed on the National Register of Historic Places since 1972.

Controversy arose in late 2007 after The State newspaper reported that the Supreme Court reversed the grades of 20 people who failed the South Carolina bar exam, including children of prominent attorneys, by voiding the results of the wills, trusts, and estates section of the exam.

From 1930 to 2016, the South Carolina Supreme Court had 17 Chief Justices.

References

External links
South Carolina Supreme Court

Courthouses on the National Register of Historic Places in South Carolina
Government buildings completed in 1921
Buildings and structures in Columbia, South Carolina
National Register of Historic Places in Columbia, South Carolina
South Carolina
South Carolina state courts
1868 establishments in South Carolina
Courts and tribunals established in 1868